The 2017 PDC Nordic & Baltic ProTour consisted of 10 darts tournaments on the 2017 PDC Pro Tour.

Prize money
The prize money for each of the Nordic & Baltic ProTour events had a prize fund of €5,000.

This is how the prize money is divided:

February

Nordic & Baltic ProTour 1
ProTour 1 was contested on Saturday 18 February 2017 at the Hotel Park Inn by Radisson in Copenhagen, Denmark.

Nordic & Baltic ProTour 2
ProTour 2 was contested on Sunday 19 February 2017 at the Hotel Park Inn by Radisson in Copenhagen, Denmark.

March

Nordic & Baltic ProTour 3
ProTour 3 was contested on Saturday 18 March 2017 at the Apple Hotel in Gothenburg, Sweden.

Nordic & Baltic ProTour 4
ProTour 4 was contested on Sunday 19 March 2017 at the Apple Hotel in Gothenburg, Sweden.

May

Nordic & Baltic ProTour 5
ProTour 5 was contested on Saturday 20 May 2017 at the Comfort Hotel Runway Gardermoen in Oslo, Norway.

Nordic & Baltic ProTour 6
ProTour 6 was contested on Sunday 21 May 2017 at the Comfort Hotel Runway Gardermoen in Oslo, Norway.

August

Nordic & Baltic ProTour 7
ProTour 7 was contested on Saturday 12 August 2017 at the Original Sokos Hotel Vantaa in Helsinki, Finland.

Nordic & Baltic ProTour 8
ProTour 8 was contested on Sunday 13 August 2017 at the Original Sokos Hotel Vantaa in Helsinki, Finland.

November

Nordic & Baltic ProTour 9
ProTour 9 was contested on Saturday 4 November 2017 at the Bellevue Park Hotel in Riga, Latvia.

Nordic & Baltic ProTour 10
ProTour 10 was contested on Sunday 5 November 2017 at the Bellevue Park Hotel in Riga, Latvia.

References

2017 in darts
2017 PDC Pro Tour